Fossarina rimata is a species of small sea snail, a marine gastropod mollusc in the family Trochidae, the top snails.

Description
The shell grows to a length of 4 mm, its diameter is 5 mm.

Distribution 
This species occurs in New Zealand.

References

 Powell, A.W.B. 1979: New Zealand Mollusca: Marine, Land and Freshwater Shells. Collins, Auckland 500p
 Spencer, H.G.; Marshall, B.A.; Maxwell, P.A.; Grant-Mackie, J.A.; Stilwell, J.D.; Willan, R.C.; Campbell, H.J.; Crampton, J.S.; Henderson, R.A.; Bradshaw, M.A.; Waterhouse, J.B.; Pojeta, J. Jr (2009). Phylum Mollusca: chitons, clams, tusk shells, snails, squids, and kin, in: Gordon, D.P. (Ed.) (2009). New Zealand inventory of biodiversity: 1. Kingdom Animalia: Radiata, Lophotrochozoa, Deuterostomia. pp. 161–254

rimata
Gastropods described in 1884